The President of the Yemen Arab Republic was the head of state in the former North Yemen from 1962 to 1990. There were six presidents of North Yemen.

List of Presidents of the Yemen Arab Republic (1962–1990)

For presidents of Yemen after 1990, see President of Yemen.

See also
Imams of Yemen
Prime Minister of Yemen Arab Republic
List of heads of state of Yemen
List of leaders of South Yemen

References

External links
World Statesmen - North Yemen

History of Yemen
 
Government of Yemen
Yemen Arab Republic
Yemen history-related lists
Yemen politics-related lists